Twenity 1991–1996 is a compilation album by L'Arc-en-Ciel, released on February 16, 2011, simultaneously with Twenity 1997-1999 and Twenity 2000-2010. It collects previously released A-sides and B-sides.

Track listing

2011 greatest hits albums
L'Arc-en-Ciel albums